Kaev Hua I (also spelled Kêo Fâ; 1580–1611), also known as Ponhea Nhom, was the Cambodian king (or regent) ruled from 1600 to 1603.

Nhom was the fourth son of Satha I. He became the king or regent after his uncle Barom Reachea III's death. He succeeded to the throne with the powerful support of the influential queen mother Devikshatri.

Nhom put down the rebellion led by Kêv, captured Kêv and had him put to death. Nhom also ended the Spanish protectorate. He moved the capital to Phnom Penh.

With the help of Siamese, Nhom's uncle Srei Soriyopear returned to Cambodia. Under the pressure of the nobility and Buddhist clergy, Nhom was forced to abdicate in favor of Srei Soriyopear in 1603. Nhom rebelled against his uncle but was killed at Stoung in 1611.

References

 Chroniques Royales du Cambodge de 1594 à 1677. École française d'Extrême Orient. Paris 1981 
 Achille Dauphin-Meunier  Histoire du Cambodge Presses universitaires de France, Paris 1968 Que sais-je ? n° 916. 
 Bernard Philippe Groslier avec la collaboration de C.R. Boxer Angkor et le Cambodge au XVIe d'après les sources portugaises et espagnoles, p. 26 Tableau III « Succession d'Ang Chan » P.U.F (Paris) 1958;

1580 births
1611 deaths
17th-century Cambodian monarchs